The Dr. Benjamin Franklin Smith House is a historic house in Waco, Tennessee, U.S..

History
The house was built in the early 1850s for William M. Hackney, a horse saddler. It was purchased by Dr. Benjamin Frankly Smith in 1855. By 1860, he owned eight slaves. During the American Civil War of 1861–1865, his son William T. Smith served in the Confederate States Army. Meanwhile, Benjamin died at the end of the war, in 1865. The house was subsequently inherited by his descendants until 1938.

The house has been listed on the National Register of Historic Places since August 23, 2006.

References

Houses on the National Register of Historic Places in Tennessee
Greek Revival architecture in Tennessee
Queen Anne architecture in Tennessee
Houses in Giles County, Tennessee